Emily Edwards (October 7, 1888– February 16, 1980) was a co-founder and first president of the San Antonio Conservation Society. She was an artist, historian and teacher, and a lifelong friend of Diego Rivera. She is remembered as being a key figure in preventing the paving over of the part of the San Antonio River that is now known as the San Antonio River Walk.

San Antonio Conservation Society
On March 23, 1924, thirteen women gathered in San Antonio for the first meeting of the San Antonio Conservation Society (SACS). The two women who had organized SACS the day before were Rena Maverick Green and Edwards.  They had met when Edwards had been renting a house from Rena's sister, Lucy Madison Maverick. Green and Edwards assembled what they believed were a cross-section of San Antonio's population who were interested in protesting the razing of a house that lay in the path of a proposed San Antonio River bypass.  Edwards was elected the organization's first president.  Edwards used her artistic bent to put on a September puppet show for city commissioners aimed at preventing a section of the river (now known as the San Antonio River Walk) from being paved over. The title of the puppet show was "The Goose and the Golden Eggs". The Goose was representative of the river, and each egg representing an aspect of city culture that benefited from the river. Edwards served as the SACS president for two years, overseeing the organization's efforts to preserve the uniqueness of San Antonio.

Early life
She was born one of four daughters on October 7, 1888, to Frank Mudge Edwards and his wife Lillian Brockway Edwards of San Antonio.  When she was seven years old, Emily's mother died, leaving her father to raise four daughters as a single father. At age ten, her father enrolled her at Ursuline Academy in San Antonio.  After Ursuline, she continued her education at San Antonio Female Institute.

Artist
From early on, Edwards exhibited promise as an artist. She trained with known artists of her time. She took classes from Pompeo Coppini in Texas, and Diego Rivera in Mexico. She also trained with Harry Mills Walcott, John Vanderpoel, Ralph Clarkson and Enella Benedict.  She enrolled in the Art Institute of Chicago in 1905, and also became an employee of the institute. At Hull House, she taught art classes to young women, and also taught art classes at the Francis W. Parker School in Chicago until 1917.  The next several years, she taught at schools in San Antonio and in West Virginia. She expanded her creative skills by working as a stage designer in New York City, and performing as a puppeteer in Massachusetts. In the 1930s, she was Hull House's artistic director.

Diego Rivera and Mexico
Edwards began spending extended periods in Mexico in 1925. She took classes from Diego Rivera, and remained a friend of his throughout the rest of his life.  In all, Edwards spent a decade off and on in Mexico, practicing her craft and researching the Mexican influence on the art world.  During that time, she published books and pamphlets on Mexican art. She married and divorced Librado de Cantabrana. The couple had one child that died in infancy.

Final years and death
From the 1950s onward, Edwards spent the rest of her life in San Antonio. She died on February 16, 1980.

Bibliography

References

1888 births
1980 deaths
20th-century American painters
20th-century American women artists
American women painters
Culture of San Antonio
History of women in Texas
Painters from Texas
Artists from San Antonio
School of the Art Institute of Chicago alumni